Odyssey is a greatest hits album by English band Take That. It was released on 23 November 2018 by Polydor Records. The collection features songs "re-imagined with new arrangements and production" by Stuart Price. Odyssey also includes three new tracks—"Out of Our Heads", "Spin", and "Everlasting". Odyssey debuted at number one on the UK Albums Chart, becoming the band's eighth number-one album and the fastest selling album by an artist of 2018, selling over 100,000 copies in its first week.

Background
As well as being mixed by Stuart Price, the album includes interview snippets throughout featuring all five Take That members. Gary Barlow stated the time of the standard greatest hits is "over" as fans can get all of an artist's songs online already, so the band wanted to release a different kind of collection. The album also features appearances from Barry Gibb and Boyz II Men.

In an interview with The Daily Telegraph about the album, Barlow stated; "If I could be bold, I don't give a shit whether the new album's a hit or not. [...] Even if it's a flop, we're still going to go on tour next year and play to 600,000 people."

Reception

In a positive review for Clash, Chloe Waterhouse notes that the album stands to "entertain their older fans as intended, and rejuvenate classics which add a pleasing new layer to their sound". Andre Paine, writing for the Evening Standard, said it was "shameless nostalgia that suggests [Take That's] legacy is in safe hands".

Track listing

Notes
 signifies an additional producer
 signifies a vocal producer

Charts

Weekly charts

Year-end charts

Certifications

References

Take That albums
2018 greatest hits albums
2018 remix albums
Albums produced by Stuart Price